Valon Ethemi (born 3 October 1997) is a Macedonian professional footballer who plays as a midfielder for Süper Lig club İstanbulspor. A former youth international for Albania, he plays for the North Macedonia national team.

Club career

Early career
Ethemi was born in Pallaticë, Zhelina to ethnic Albanian parents but later moved to Albania where he joined the Dinamo Tirana academy as a 17-year-old, where he remained for one year before joining professional side Adriatiku Mamurras in the Albanian First Division, the second tier of football in Albania. He featured in 22 league games for the club during the 2016–17 campaign, scoring 4 goals in the process which landed him a move to Albanian Superliga champions Kukësi.

Kukësi
He officially joined Kukësi on 28 August 2017, penning a three-year contract and receiving squad number 27. Later on 6 September, he was on the bench for his side's 2017 Albanian Supercup loss to Tirana. He played his first Albanian Superliga match three days later on the opening league game of the season, coming on as a 76th-minute substitute for Ndriçim Shtubina in the 1–0 home win over newly promoted Kamza. He scored his first league goal for the club on 16 October 2017 in a 4–2 home victory over KF Teuta Durrës. His goal, scored in the 31st minute, made the score 2–0 in favor of Kukësi. He was later subbed out, being replaced by Rauf Aliyev in the 78th minute.

İstanbulspor
Ethemi helped İstanbulspor achieve promotion in the 2021-22 season for the first time in 17 years. He started in İstanbulspor return to the Süper Lig in a 2–0 season opening loss to Trabzonspor on 5 August 2022.

International career
On 28 May 2018 Ethemi made his debut with Albania U21 in a friendly match against Bosnia and Herzegovina U21 after being named in the starting line-up.

On 12 June 2022 Ethemi made his debut with North Macedonia in a match of UEFA Nations League against Gibraltar.

Career statistics

References

External links
FSHF profile
Football Database Profile

1997 births
Living people
People from Želino Municipality
Macedonian footballers
North Macedonia international footballers
Albanian footballers
Albania youth international footballers
Albanians in North Macedonia
Albanian footballers from North Macedonia
Association football midfielders
FK Dinamo Tirana players
KF Adriatiku Mamurrasi players
FK Kukësi players
İstanbulspor footballers
Kategoria Superiore players
Kategoria e Parë players
Süper Lig players
TFF First League players
Macedonian expatriate footballers
Macedonian expatriate sportspeople in Turkey
Albanian expatriate footballers
Albanian expatriate sportspeople in Turkey
Expatriate footballers in Turkey